Faiza Ahmad Malik (born 15 May 1970) is a Pakistani politician who was a Member of the Provincial Assembly of the Punjab, from 2002 to May 2018.

Early life and education
She was born on 15 May 1970 in Lahore.

She earned a Bachelor of Arts in 1989 from Queen Mary College, Lahore.

Political career

She was elected to the Provincial Assembly of the Punjab as a candidate of Pakistan Peoples Party (PPP) on a reserved seat for women in 2002 Pakistani general election.

She was re-elected to the Provincial Assembly of the Punjab as a candidate of PPP on a reserved seat for women in 2008 Pakistani general election.

She was re-elected to the Provincial Assembly of the Punjab as a candidate of PPP on a reserved seat for women in 2013 Pakistani general election.

References

Living people
Punjab MPAs 2013–2018
1970 births
Pakistan People's Party MPAs (Punjab)
Punjab MPAs 2002–2007
Punjab MPAs 2008–2013
Women members of the Provincial Assembly of the Punjab
Queen Mary College, Lahore alumni
21st-century Pakistani women politicians